Alianza F.C. from El Salvador won the 1997 Torneo Grandes de Centroamerica after defeating Deportivo Saprissa in a single final match played in Costa Rica.

Teams

Group A

Standings

 Saprissa and Alianza qualified to the Semifinals.

Group B

Standings

 Alajuelense and Municipal qualified to the Semifinals.

Semifinals

 Alianza 2–2 Municipal on aggregate; Alianza won 4–2 on penalty shootouts.

 Saprissa won 4–0 on aggregate; serie decided in one match.

Final

 Alianza 1997 Central American champion; series decided in one match.

References

1997
1
1996–97 in Honduran football
1996–97 in Salvadoran football
1996–97 in Guatemalan football
1996–97 in Costa Rican football